Březí (until 1949 Prátlsbrun) is a municipality and village in Břeclav District in the South Moravian Region of the Czech Republic. It has about 1,700 inhabitants.

History
The first written mention of Březí is from 1249. The village was probably founded in the 11th or 12th century.

Until 1918, Březí was part of the Austrian monarchy (Austria side after the compromise of 1867), in the Nikolsburg (Mikulov) District, one of the 34 Bezirkshauptmannschaften in Moravia.

Demographics

References

External links

 

Villages in Břeclav District